Kučinić (pronounced t͡ʃ ... t͡ɕ), often anglicized to Kucinich (pronounced s ... t͡ʃ) is a Croatian family name. Notable persons with that surname include:
 Dennis Kucinich (born 1946), American politician
 Elizabeth Kucinich (born 1977), director of public affairs for the Physicians Committee for Responsible Medicine and wife of Dennis
 Jackie Kucinich (born 1981), American reporter and daughter of Dennis

Croatian surnames